Brandt Zwieback-Schokoladen GmbH + Co. KG is a zwieback and chocolate producer in Germany. The company was established on 12 October 1912 in Hagen by Carl Brandt. In 2007, director Peter Scharf made a documentary on the company's history for WDR.

References

Food and drink companies established in 1912
Manufacturing companies of Germany
Companies based in North Rhine-Westphalia
German brands
1912 establishments in Germany